Pomarance is a comune (municipality) in the Province of Pisa in the Italian region Tuscany, located about  southwest of Florence and about 60 km southeast of Pisa.

Pomarance borders the following municipalities: Casole d'Elsa, Castelnuovo di Val di Cecina, Montecatini Val di Cecina, Monterotondo Marittimo, Monteverdi Marittimo, Radicondoli, Volterra.

Pomarance was the hometown of three painters called Pomarancio after it.

From 1968 to 1992 there was at San Dalmazio the static inverter plant of HVDC Italy–Corsica–Sardinia. Today, there is a solar park.

References

External links

 Official website